The St. Barbara Gasthuis was a hospital and later a hofje on the Jansstraat in Haarlem, Netherlands. All that remains is a former gateway.

It was founded in 1435 by Hugo van Assendelft according to a chronogram written on the gate built in 1624 by Lieven de Key: 

"OM dat WII oVt ende behoeftICh sChenen VerLaten
Heeft HVgo Van AffendeLf hIer gestICht tonfer baten"

The capitalized letters that are Roman numerals (the W is read as VV) results in a list of Roman numerals that when added up give the year of establishment of the hospital 1 x M + 3 x C + 2 x L + 6 x V + 5 x I = 1435. As the hospital functions in later centuries were consolidated at the St. Elisabeth Gasthuis, the former hospital became a hofje, which later was abandoned and became derelict. The old hofje was torn down in 1845, leaving the old gateway as a memorial.

Address: Janstraat 54, Haarlem

References
Architectuurgids Haarlem, by Piet Roos, J. Bart Uittenhout
 Haarlems hofjes, Dr. G. H. Kurtz, Schuyt & Co C.V., Haarlem, 1972, 

Rijksmonuments in Haarlem
Hofjes
1435 establishments in Europe
Demolished buildings and structures in the Netherlands
Buildings and structures demolished in 1845